Javad Razzaghi (born 28 November 1982 in Tehran) is an Iranian professional footballer who currently plays for Shahrdari Bandar Abbas in the Azadegan League.

Club career

Club career statistics
Last Update  13 May 2022 

 Assist Goals

External links
Persian League Profile

Living people
1982 births
Iranian footballers
Iranian expatriate footballers
Pas players
F.C. Aboomoslem players
Esteghlal Ahvaz players
Persepolis F.C. players
Shahrdari Bandar Abbas players
SK Sturm Graz players
FC Admira Wacker Mödling players
FC DAC 1904 Dunajská Streda players
Slovak Super Liga players
Expatriate footballers in Slovakia
Iranian expatriate sportspeople in Slovakia
Expatriate footballers in Austria
Iranian expatriate sportspeople in Austria
Association football midfielders